Text replacement may refer to:

 Cut, copy, and paste
 Find and replace (disambiguation)
 Autoreplace (disambiguation)